Yumbu Lakhang or Yumbu Lakhar (also known as Yumbu Lakhang) is an ancient structure in the Yarlung Valley in the vicinity of Tsetang, Nêdong County, the seat of Lhoka Prefecture, in Tibet

According to legend, it was the first building in Tibet and the palace of the first Tibetan king, Nyatri Tsenpo.

History
According to Tibetan traditions, Yumbu Lakhang was built for the first Tibetan king, Nyatri Tsenpo, who descended from the sky with his grandmother. It was probably built at the turn of the seventh and eighth centuries. During the reign of the 28th king, Thothori Nyantsen, in the fifth century CE, a golden stupa, a jewel (and/or a form to the manufacture of dough-Stupas) and a sutra that no one could read fell from the sky onto the roof of the Yumbu Lakhang; a voice from the sky announced, "In five generations one shall come that understands its meaning!" Later, Yumbu Lakhang became the summer palace of the 33rd Tibetan king, Songtsen Gampo (604-650 CE) and his Chinese princess, Wencheng. After Songtsen Gampo had transferred the seat of his temporal and spiritual authority to Lhasa, Yumbu Lakhang became a shrine.

A thousand years later, during the reign of the 5th Dalai Lama (1617-82), the palace was turned into a monastery for the Gelug school.  

The Yumbu Lakhang was heavily damaged and reduced to a single storey during the Cultural revolution but was reconstructed in 1983.

As of November 2017 the palace is undergoing $1.5m of restoration works to reinforce its crumbling wooden foundations and cracked walls. It is expected to reopen to the public in April 2018.

Interior
The castle is divided into front and rear precincts. The front is a three-storey building while the rear is dominated by a tall tower, like a castle. Enshrined at the palace are the statues of Thiesung Sangjie Buddha, King Niechi, the first King of Tibet, Songtsen Gampo and other Tubo kings.

Zorthang
Traditionally, the largest cultivated area in Tibet, called Zorthang, is located to the northwest, below Yumbu Lakhang. Even today, farmers sprinkle soil from Zorthang on their own fields to ensure a good harvest. There used to be a temple, Lharu Menlha, containing images of the Eight Medicine Buddhas near the area.

Footnotes

References
 Buckley, Michael and Strauss, Robert. Tibet: a travel survival kit. (1986) Lonely Planet Publications, Victoria, Australia. .
 Das, Sarat Chandra. (1902). Lhasa and Central Tibet. Reprint: (1988). Mehra Offset Press, Delhi.
 Dorje, Gyume (1999). Footprint Tibet Handbook with Bhutan. Footprint Handbooks, Bath, England. .
 Dowman, Keith. (1988) The Power-Places of Central Tibet: The Pilgrim's Guide. Routledge & Kegan Paul, London & New York. .
 Mayhew, Bradley and Kohn, Michael. (2005) Tibet. 6th Edition. .
 ngag dbang blo bzang rgya mtsho: bod kyi deb ther dpyid kyi rgyal mo’i glu dbyangs. Kapitel 2 und 3. Übersetzung von Zahiruddin Ahmad ins Englische: A History of Tibet by the Fifth Dalai Lama of Tibet (Bloomington, Indiana University 1995), .
 nor brang o rgyan: gangs can yul gyi sa la spyod pa’i mtho ris kyi rgyal byon gtso bor brjod pa’i deb ther rdzogs ldan gzhon nu’i dga' ston dpyid kyi rgyal mo’i glu dyangs-kyi ’grel pa yid kyi dga’ ston (Beijing, mi rigs dpe skrun khang / Mínzú chūbǎnshè 民族出版社 1993), .
History of Tibet – A Few Chapters (Part 1)

External links 

 Yum bu bla sgang  (Tibetan and Himalayan Digital Library)

Buddhist buildings in Tibet
Forts in Tibet
Dzongs in Tibet
History of Tibet
Buddhist monasteries in Tibet
Tibetan Buddhist places
Palaces in Tibet